Dora Cojocaru (born 20 August 1963 in Baia Mare) is a Romanian composer.

Cojocaru studied at the Gheorghe Dima Music Academy in Cluj-Napoca and obtained diplomas in composition, pedagogy and piano there in 1986. After studying with Johannes Fritsch at the Hochschule für Musik Köln, she was awarded a master's degree in composition. In 1997, she obtained a Ph.D. in musicology with a thesis on György Ligeti. After publication in 1999, the work was awarded the prize of the Romanian Composers' Union.

From 1990 to 2002, Cojocaru taught at the Music Academy of Cluj-Napoca, and from 1993 to 1995 she worked for the Westdeutscher Rundfunk. She has been living in Montreal since 2002 and teaches at different music institutions.

Work 
Structuri for orchestra, 1985
Luci, soare, luci, cantata for choir and orchestra, 1986
Bocet pentru Manole, cantata for vocal soloists and chamber ensemble, 1987
Cantos ll for mezzo-soprano and clarinet, 1991
Vitalitate! for string orchestra, 1991
Poarta Soarelui for flute and percussion, 1992
A3 for clarinet, piano and percussion, 1992 (CD: Hungaroton, Budapest, 1998)
Trills, string trio, 1992
String Quartet No. 1, 1994
Riga Crypto si Lapona Enigel, Chamber Opera, 1994
Concertare, trombone quartet, 1995
Galgenlieder in der Nacht, chamber cantata after Christian Morgenstern for soprano and ensemble, 1995
Fragmenti for trombone solo, 1996
5 Moments Efemere for wind quintet, 1996
String Quartet No. 2 "...esser loro Padre, Guida ed Amico! - in memoriam A. Kaercher", 1996
...on revient toujours! for clarinet and ensemble, 1996
Refrains for clarinet solo, 1997 (CD: Computer Music Production, Cluj, 2002)
Qu.-Sax., Saxophone Quartet, 1997
Trio Violinissimo, 1998
Violinissimo for string ensemble, 1998
Concerto for Percussion and Orchestra, 1999
Dati-mi lampa lui Aladin, chamber cantata for soprano and ensemble, 1998 (CD: Computer Music Production, Cluj, 2002)
The other side of silence for oboe, violin, viola and cello, 2001 (CD: GunPowderTower Studio, Sibiu, 2002)
Concerto for oboe and strings, 2001 (CD: Sibiu, 2002)
Transparencies for clarinet and ensemble, 2002
Basel Concerto for trombone and chamber ensemble, 2002
De doinit for flute and harpsichord, 2003
Etudes oubliées, clarinets (bassoon) quartet, 2003
Virelais et virelangues, chamber cantata for voice and ensemble, 2003
Schattenspiel for oboe and cello (or clarinet), 2004
Clopote si orgi for organ, two organ positives and tubular bells, 2004
Venice for voice, flute, baroque cello and harpsichord (text after Friedrich Nietzsche), 2005

References

External links  
 

Romanian composers
Women composers
20th-century classical composers
Romanian emigrants to Canada
Academic staff of McGill University
1963 births
Living people
People from Baia Mare